Dolycoris is a genus of shield bug in the family Pentatomidae.

Species
 Dolycoris alobatus Hasan & Afzal, 1990 
 Dolycoris baccarum (Linnaeus, 1758) - Sloe Bug 
 Dolycoris bengalensis Zaidi, 1995 
 Dolycoris brachyserratus Hasan & Afzal, 1990 
 Dolycoris formosanus Distant, 1887 
 Dolycoris indicus Stål, 1876 
 Dolycoris longispermathecus Hasan & Afzal, 1990 
 Dolycoris numidicus Horváth, 1908 
 Dolycoris penicillatus Horváth, 1904 
 Dolycoris rotundiparatergite Hasan & Afzal, 1990

References
 Biolib

Pentatomidae
Pentatomidae genera